The Women's Sprint was one of the 7 women's events at the 2007 UCI Track Cycling World Championships, held in Palma de Mallorca, Spain.

25 cyclists from 16 countries participated in the contest. After the qualifying heats, the fastest 24 riders were to advance to the 1/16 finals, therefore all riders who contested the qualification advanced to the next round.

The first rider in each of the 12 heats advanced to the second round. There was no repechage for this round.

The first rider from each of the six Second Round heats advanced to the Quarterfinals and the second placed riders from a repechage to determine the other two riders that competed the quarterfinals.

The first rider in each quarterfinal advanced to the semifinals and the 4 losing athletes faced a race for 5th-8th place.

The qualifying, first round, second round, second round repechages and quarterfinals took place on 30 March. The Semifinals and Finals took place on 31 March.

World record

Qualification

References

Women's sprint
UCI Track Cycling World Championships – Women's sprint
UCI